"The Little Girl" is a song written by Harley Allen and recorded by American country music artist John Michael Montgomery. The song features harmony vocals by bluegrass musicians Alison Krauss and Dan Tyminski, both members of Alison Krauss and Union Station. It was released in August 2000 as the lead single from the album Brand New Me. The song became Montgomery's seventh and last No. 1 hit to date on the Billboard Hot Country Singles & Tracks chart, and his first chart-topper since 1995's "Sold (The Grundy County Auction Incident)". The song also reached No. 35 on the Billboard Hot 100.

Critical reception
Chuck Taylor, of Billboard magazine reviewed the song favorably saying that "every element flows seamlessly together, from the understated production and the tendered melody to Montgomery's carefully measured performance."

Chart positions
"The Little Girl" reached number one on the Billboard country chart in late 2000, holding the position for three weeks. It was Montgomery's seventh number-one hit and first since "Sold (The Grundy County Auction Incident)" in 1995. The song also reached number one on the RPM country singles chart in Canada, and was that publication's last country number-one hit as RPM closed in November 2000.

Year-end charts

References

2000 singles
2000 songs
John Michael Montgomery songs
Songs written by Harley Allen
Song recordings produced by Buddy Cannon
Song recordings produced by Norro Wilson
Songs about child abuse
Atlantic Records singles